Camilla Louise Skaarberg Jensen (born 25 October 1982 in Copenhagen) is a Danish curler. She currently plays on a team skipped by sister Angelina Jensen.

Jensen was a member of the Danish team that won a silver medal at the 2007 World Women's Curling Championship. Later that year, she won a silver medal at the 2007 European Mixed Curling Championship playing third for Joel Ostrowski. She won another silver medal at the 2009 European Mixed Curling Championship with Ostrowski.

Personal life
As of 2018, Jensen works as a course administrator in technical education, was married and has one son.

Team mates 
2007 Aomori World Championships - Madeleine Dupont, fourth
2008 Vernon World Championships - Denise Dupont, third
2009 Gangneung World Championships - Angelina Jensen, skip
2010 Vancouver Olympic Games - Ane Hansen, alternate

External links

References

Danish female curlers
Living people
Curlers at the 2010 Winter Olympics
Olympic curlers of Denmark
1982 births
Danish curling coaches
Sportspeople from Copenhagen
21st-century Danish women